Qeshlaq-e Ali Akbar may refer to:
Qeshlaq-e Ali Akbar Hamzeh